The Boccia Pairs BC4 event at the 2008 Summer Paralympics was held in the Olympic Green Convention Center on 10–12 September.
The preliminary stages consisted of 2 round-robin groups of 4 pairs each. The top two teams in each group qualified for the final stages.
The event was won by the team representing .

Results
 indicates a match in which an extra (fifth) end was played.

Preliminaries

Pool A

Pool B

Competition bracket

References

Boccia at the 2008 Summer Paralympics